The Emrax 207 is a Slovenian electric motor for powering electric aircraft and other applications, designed and produced by Emrax d.o.o of Kamnik. The company was formerly called Enstroj and based in Radomlje.

By April 2018 the engine was no longer advertised on the company website and seems to be out of production.

Design and development
The Emrax 207 is a brushless design producing , with an outrunner coil. The low working rpm of the engine means that it can turn a propeller at efficient speeds without the need for a reduction drive.

Specifications (Emrax 207)

See also

References

Aircraft electric engines